Alienation may refer to:
 Alienation (property law), the legal transfer of title of ownership to another party
 Alienation (video game), a 2016 PlayStation 4 video game
 "Alienation" (speech), an inaugural address by Jimmy Reid as Rector of the University of Glasgow
 Social alienation, an individual's estrangement from society

See also 

 Alien Nation (disambiguation)
 Alienability (disambiguation)
 Alienation effect, an audience's inability to identify with a character in a performance, as an intended consequence of the actor's interpretation of the script
 Alienation of affection(s), a legal term whereby a third party is blamed for the breakdown of a personal relationship
 Marx's theory of alienation, the separation of things that naturally belong together, or antagonism between those who are properly in harmony
 Parental alienation, a process through which a child becomes estranged from a parent as the result of the psychological manipulation of another parent.
 Parental alienation syndrome, the theory that a set of behaviors in a child who displays extreme but unwarranted fear, disrespect or hostility towards a parent can be used to establish that the child's reaction was caused by the other parent.